The Thorntonbank Wind Farm is an offshore wind farm,  off the Belgian coast, in water ranging from  deep.

Electricity production started in early 2009, with a capacity of 30 MW.
The capacity was increased to a total of 214 MW in 2012 and 325 MW in 2013.

Phases

First phase 
The first phase was built by C-Power and consists of six REpower offshore wind turbines of 5 MW capacity on the Thornton sandbank, at a cost of €153 million. It was commissioned in June 2009. A 37 km 150 kV undersea cable connects the Thorntonbank Wind Farm to the shore.

The first phase of what will ultimately be a 325 MW wind farm was completed in September 2008. The six REpower 5 MW turbines, which were installed on concrete gravity foundations, were linked to the Belgian power grid, giving a total rated capacity of 30 MW for the first stage. The full story of the design, engineering, construction and installation of the Thorntonbank Wind Farm (first phase) is told in an illustrated book that was published in November 2010.

Second and third phase 
In these phases, a total of 48 additional wind turbines of 6.15MWp were installed.

Phase 2, completed in October 2012, comprises the installation of 30 of the 48 wind turbines. These wind turbines have been installed on steel jacket foundations designed by OWEC Tower AS and assembled at Smulders, Hoboken.

In the third and last phase, completed in September 2013, the remaining 18 wind turbines were installed, bringing the total capacity to around 325 MW.

Environmental assessment 
To assess the environmental impact C-Power has enlisted the assistance of the Research Institute for Nature and Forest (INBO) and the Institute for Agricultural and Fisheries Research (ILVO ) to obtain the most detailed possible information on the occurrence of these animal species at Thornton Bank and to assess the possible effect of a wind farm on them.

How the Wind Farms affect the landscape will be studied by WES-Onderzoek & Advies, who were also involved in earlier research in connection with the perceived impact on the landscape of near shore wind farms.

Offshore wind farms may affect sea fishing. Certain areas may be closed to commercial fishing, as a result of which the total area that can be fished is reduced, but new habitats may also be created as a result. The basis for this study is a thorough investigation of the importance of the Thornton Bank for sea fishing.

Offshore wind farms create new structures at sea and by definition they therefore pose an additional risk to the safety of shipping. C-Power has, however, chosen a location which is a long way from the most important shipping routes so that this risk can be reduced to a minimum. C-Power will be calling upon the specialised knowledge of German consultants Germanischer Lloyd.

Financing 
Thorntonbank was only the second offshore wind farm to be project financed.

Gallery

See also

 Belwind offshore Wind Farm (Belgium)
 Wind power in Belgium
 Energy in Belgium
 List of offshore wind farms
 List of wind farms

References

External links

 
Thornton Bank, RWE Innogy
 
 LORC Knowledge - Datasheet for Thornton Bank 1

Offshore wind farms in the North Sea
Wind farms in Belgium
Ostend
Energy infrastructure completed in 2013
2013 establishments in Belgium